The 1917 All-Big Ten Conference football team consists of American football players selected to the All-Big Ten Conference teams chosen by various selectors for the 1917 college football season.

All Big-Ten selections

Ends
 Charles Bolen, Ohio State (BB, JV, LA, LGS, LH, PD)
 W. M. Kelley, Wisconsin (BB, GWA, LA, LGS, PD)
 Dwight V. Peabody, Ohio State (LH)
 Charles Laun, Iowa (GWA)

Tackles
 George Hauser, Minnesota (BB, GWA, JV, LA, LGS, LH, PD)
 Ray Eklund, Minnesota (BB [guard], GWA [guard], JV, LGS [guard], LH, PD)
 Elmert T. Rundquist, Illinois (BB, GWA, LA [guard], LGS [guard])
 Harold J. Courtney, Ohio State (LA, LGS, PD [guard])

Guards
 Charles Higgins, Chicago (BB, GWA, LA, PD)
 Frank Culver, Michigan (JV, LH)
 Harry R. Shlaudeman, Illinois (JW, LH)

Centers
 Oscar Lambert, Michigan (JV, LGS, LH)
 Charles Carpenter, Wisconsin (GWA, PD)
 Russell G. Hathaway, Indiana (LA)
 Dutch Gorgas, Chicago (BB)

Quarterbacks
 Archie Weston, Michigan (JV, LA [halfback], LGS, LH)
 Eber Simpson, Wisconsin (BB, GWA [halfback], LA, PD)
 Howard Yerges Sr., Ohio State (GWA)

Halfbacks
 Chic Harley, Ohio State (BB, GWA, JV, LA, LGS, LH, PD)
 Cliff Sparks, Michigan (JV, LH)
 Lloyd Ellingwood, Northwestern (LGS, PD)
 Tad Wieman, Michigan (BB)

Fullbacks
 Bob Koehler, Northwestern (BB, GWA, LA, LGS, PD)
 Higgins, Chicago (JV, LH)

Key

Bold = consensus choice by a majority of the selectors

BB = Bill Bailey in Chicago American

FM = Frank G. Menke, sporting editor of Newspaper Feature Service

GWA = G. W. Axelson in Chicago Herald

JV = Jack Veiock

LA = Leonard Adams, football editor of Chicago Journal

LGS = Lambert G. Sullivan, football editor of Chicago Daily News

LH = Luther A. Huston

PD = Paddy Driscoll in Chicago Examiner

See also
1917 College Football All-America Team
1917 All-Western college football team

References

1917 Big Ten Conference football season
All-Big Ten Conference football teams